"Music for Money" is a 1996 song recorded by British, Italy based Eurodance artist Ice MC, featuring vocals by Italian singer Valentina Ducros, who also appeared on "Give Me the Light". Produced by German Eurodance project Masterboy, it was released as the second single from Ice MC's fourth album, Dreadatour. It was successful in the Czech Republic and Finland, where it peaked at number 8 and 12. A music video was made to accompany the single.

Critical reception
Pan-European magazine Music & Media wrote, "Ice MC sings raggamuffin' style over dance beats. He should be praised for the honest lyrical content. The second, more clubby radio cut, has slightly more potential than the first."

Music video
The accompanying music video for "Music for Money" was directed by Stephan Hadjam.

Track listing

Charts

References

 

1996 singles
1996 songs
Ice MC songs